The Alexander ALX100 is a minibus body that was built by Alexander of the United Kingdom. Over 150 bodies were built between 1997 and 1999, exclusively on the Mercedes-Benz O814D Vario and O810D van chassis, and was fitted with seating capacities between 25 and 31 passengers.

The ALX100 was a replacement for the AM-Type 'Sprint' body, fitted to the previous Mercedes 709D chassis. With the retention of the Mercedes front end grille, bonnet and headlights, the ALX100 was extremely visually similar to the Plaxton Beaver 2, which was also bodied on the Vario. The Mercedes front end also meant that the ALX100 did not fit in with the visual features of the rest of the ALX product family, which had a distinctive common design for the front and rear, which was launched by Alexander to highlight its emerging low-floor bus products.

The O814D/ALX100 combination was bought in large numbers by Thames Transit, Stagecoach North West, Devon General, Arriva Northumbria, Arriva Fox County (and its predecessor Midland Fox), Midland Red North and Travel West Midlands. There are few variants of the body, some have higher windows and different door styles as well as two different lengths depending on the wheelbase model, similar to the Plaxton Beaver 2.

See also

 List of buses

References

ALX100
Minibuses
Single-deck buses
Vehicles introduced in 1997